Samuel H. Roys (September 5, 1821 – August 18, 1857) was a member of the Wisconsin State Assembly.

Biography
Roys was born on September 5, 1821, in Landaff, New Hampshire. He later lived in Stoughton, Wisconsin. He died of dysentery on August 18, 1857.

Career
Roys was a member of the Assembly during the 1848 and 1849 sessions. Later, he was elected District Attorney of Dane County, Wisconsin in 1852. Roys was elected to be a judge on the Dane County Bench in 1857, but died before he could take office. He was a Democrat.

References

External links

People from Landaff, New Hampshire
People from Stoughton, Wisconsin
Democratic Party members of the Wisconsin State Assembly
District attorneys in Wisconsin
Wisconsin state court judges
1821 births
1857 deaths
Burials in Wisconsin
19th-century American politicians
19th-century American judges